Pilia (Abkhaz: Ҧлиа, Russian: Пилия) is an Abkhaz surname that may refer to

Diana Pilia (born 1967), Abkhazian lawyer and politician 
Marina Pilia, Abkhazian lawyer and politician 
Nodar Pilia, Minister of Culture of Abkhazia

Abkhaz-language surnames
Russian-language surnames